In September 2001, the German version of Popstars returned with a second season, this time searching for a mixed-gender musical R&B group. More than 11,000 hopeful singers attended open television auditions in Frankfurt, Cologne, Berlin, Stuttgart, Hamburg, and Munich, conducted by choreographer Detlef "D!" Soost, producer Alex Christensen, and singer and radio host Noah Sow. Over the course of several recalls and re-recalls the three judges and vocal coach Artemis Gounaki reduced the contestants to a group of 32 who immediately travelled to Ibiza, Spain to get trained in singing, dancing, and fitness. In the end three females and five males remained who again moved into a loft in Munich to start working on their performance and publicity skills.

During a special episode on 11 November 2001, judges Soost and Christensen eventually disclosed that Ross Antony, Hila Bronstein, Shaham Joyce, Faiz Mangat, Indira Weis, and Giovanni Zarrella were chosen to become part of the multicultural group Bro'Sis.

 The contestant became part of the winning band Bro'Sis.
 The contestant made it to the final eight.

Title translation: You Are My DreamWinning band: Bro'SisJudges: Alex Christensen, Detlef Soost, Noah SowCoaches: Artemis Gounaki , D. Soost

Television ratings 

Germany

References

External links 
Official website
Official Facebook account
Official Warner Music label site
 

Du bist mein Traum
2001 German television seasons